The New Academy Prize in Literature was established in 2018 as an alternative to the Nobel Prize in Literature, which was not awarded in 2018 and instead postponed until 2019. The winner was announced on 12 October 2018 given to the Guadeloupan-French author Maryse Condé who was described by the jury as a "grand storyteller whose authorship belongs to world literature, describing the ravages of colonialism and the postcolonial chaos in a language which is both precise and overwhelming."

The New Academy was formed as non-profit organization in 2018, not affiliated with either the Nobel Foundation or the Swedish Academy, and was dissolved in December 2018.

Nominations
Following an open invitation to the world, calling for public votes for 47 candidates nominated by Swedish librarians, the New Academy announced that the four finalists for the prize were Maryse Condé, Neil Gaiman, Haruki Murakami, and Kim Thúy. There were 12 nominees each from Sweden and the United States, 5 from United Kingdom, 3 each from France and Canada, and 2 each from Italy and Nigeria. 

On 17 September 2018, Murakami requested that his nomination be withdrawn, saying he wanted to "concentrate on writing, away from media attention."

The winner
The New Academy Prize in Literature was awarded to Maryse Condé. The jury said in its motivation: 

Maryse Condé received the prize on 10 December 2018 at a ceremony at Berns salonger in Stockholm. The prize sum, 320 000 Swedish crowns, was created through crowdfunding and sponsorship.

Reactions
The establishment of the prize caused several negative reactions in  Swedish media, some criticizing the New Academy's intention to award "morally good literature" and cultural journalist Göran Sommardal called the prize "pathetic". Swedish author Ulf Lundell, himself one of the 47 nominees for the prize, said he thought that "no author of any self-preservation will accept it". Internationally reactions were more positive, Alison Flood in The Guardian said: "Perhaps the most striking detail of all is found not in the names, but the fine print. The New Academy is enforcing a gender quota on the shortlist stage, stipulating that it comprises two men and two women. How different this is to the Nobel, which counts among its 114 winners just 14 women", and also praised the nomination process of public votes: "How open. How inclusive".

References

External links
The New Academy

2018 establishments in Sweden
Awards established in 2018
Fiction awards